Tonton may refer to:

People
Tonton David, David Grammont, French Reggae singer
Tonton Gutierrez, Eduardo Antonio Winsett Gutierrez, Jr., (born 1964), a Filipino film and television actor 
Tonton Landicho (born 1978), a Filipino actor
Tonton Semakala (born 1975), a professional boxer from Sweden
Tonton Susanto (born 1973), an Indonesian professional racing cyclist
Tonton Zola Moukoko (born 1983), a Congolese footballer 
Washington "Tonton" Young, Filipino cartoonist known for Pupung daily comic strip

Other uses
 tonton (video portal), a Malaysian video portal
 Tonton (spider), a genus of South American spiders
 The Tontons, an American band from Houston, Texas
 Tonton, a Muppet on Hikayat Simsim, a Jordanian version of Sesame Street
Tonton Island, Indonesia, connected by the Barelang Bridge

See also 

Ton (disambiguation)
Tonson (surname)
Tonton Macoute (disambiguation)
 Tauntaun, a fictional creature from the Star Wars films
 Ton-Taun, an American rock band from Pennsylvania
 Tonton Tapis–GB, a 1991 Belgian professional cycling team